Roy North, born 16 March 1941 in Hull, East Riding of Yorkshire, England is an English actor and television presenter, who played Mr Roy in Basil Brush.

He attended Hull Grammar School and is a Hull City fan, and occasionally he would wear a Hull City shirt on the television. He trained as an actor at the Rose Bruford College of Speech and Drama, and then appeared in repertory theatre in Yorkshire, West End musical productions and pantomimes.

He appeared on series 8–11 of the original Basil Brush Show from 1973 until 1976. He had been appearing in the London West End production of Joseph and the Amazing Technicolor Dreamcoat, when he received a call to audition to replace Derek Fowlds as the glove puppet's companion. After leaving The Basil Brush Show, he hosted the ITV children's music show Get It Together, with Linda Fletcher and later Megg Nichol from 1976 to 1982 and appeared on Seaside Special and other shows. In 2004, he guest starred in the Doctor Who audio adventure, "The Axis of Insanity".

References

External links
Interview in the Northern Echo

1941 births
Living people
Male actors from Kingston upon Hull